This table displays the top-rated primetime television series of the 2017–18 season, as measured by Nielsen Media Research.

References

2017 in American television
2018 in American television
2017-related lists
2018-related lists
Lists of American television series